Mississippi's 4th congressional district covers the southeastern region of the state. It includes all of Mississippi's Gulf Coast, stretching ninety miles between the Alabama border to the east and the Louisiana border to the west, and extends north into the Pine Belt region.  It includes three of Mississippi's four most heavily populated cities: Gulfport, Biloxi, and Hattiesburg. Other major cities within the district include Bay St. Louis, Laurel, and Pascagoula.

The people of the Mississippi's 4th are currently represented by Republican Mike Ezell. During the 111th Congress, MS-4, along with Texas's 17th congressional district, was the most Republican district in the nation to be represented by a Democrat, with a Cook PVI of R+20. However, on November 2, 2010, the Democratic incumbents of both districts were defeated by their respective Republican challengers. State Representative Steven Palazzo defeated Democrat Gene Taylor by a 5% vote differential.

From statehood to the election of 1846, Mississippi elected representatives at-large statewide on a general ticket.

Cities
Three of Mississippi's four most heavily populated cities, Gulfport, Biloxi, Hattiesburg are in the Fourth District.  Other major cities within the district include Bay St. Louis, Laurel, and Pascagoula.

Counties
Since 2013 the entire counties of Hancock, Harrison, Jackson, Pearl River, Stone, George, Marion, Lamar, Forrest, Perry, Greene, Jones, and Wayne, along with the southeastern part of Clarke are counted in this district.

Federal highways
Interstate 59 is an important north–south route that traverses the district, while coastal Interstate 10 serves as the major east–west route from New Orleans to Mobile. US Highway 49 is a vital hurricane evacuation route and is four-laned from Gulfport to Jackson. US Highway 84 enters the state near Waynesboro and is four-laned statewide, passing through Laurel, Brookhaven and Natchez.

Boundaries
From 1973 to 2003, the district included most of Jackson, all of Natchez and the southwestern part of the state. In 2003, after Mississippi lost a seat in redistricting, the old 4th District was eliminated. Most of Jackson, as well as the bulk of the district's black constituents, were drawn into the 2nd District, while eastern Jackson and most of Jackson's suburbs were drawn into the 3rd District. As a result, most of the old 5th District was redefined as the new 4th District.

The perimeter of the current Fourth District extends across the ninety-mile coastal southern edge of Mississippi from the Louisiana border to the Alabama border, following the Alabama state line north along the eastern border of the state to a point due east of Quitman in Clarke County where it is bounded by the 3rd District and then moves in an irregular fashion south of Quitman until it reaches the county line with Wayne County, and then follows the northern and western borders to wholly contain Jones, Forrest, Lamar, and Marion counties until it reaches the Louisiana state line, ultimately bounded by the Pearl River winding to its outlet in Lake Borgne.

History
The district, like most of Mississippi, is built on a strong history of agriculture.

Politically, the district has been conservative even by Mississippi standards. What is now the 4th has not supported the official Democratic candidate for president since 1956. Since the turn of the millennium, it has given the Republican presidential candidate his highest margin in the state.

Long after this area turned solidly Republican at the federal level, conservative Democrats like longtime congressman Gene Taylor still held a number of local offices. Nevertheless, it was a foregone conclusion that Taylor would be succeeded by a Republican. 

This came to pass in 2010, when then-state representative Palazzo narrowly defeated Taylor in that year’s massive Republican wave. The Democrats have only put up nominal challengers in the district since then; only one Democrat has managed even 30 percent of the vote. Indeed, the Democrats did not even field a candidate in 2020. Palazzo’s win touched off a wave of Republican victories downballot, and today there are almost no elected Democrats left above the county level. Underscoring this, Taylor sought to take back his old seat in 2014 as a Republican.

Election results from presidential races

List of members representing the district

Recent elections

2002

2004

2006

Fourth District incumbent Gene Taylor (D) was re-elected, gathering 80% of the Fourth District's vote. He is considered one of the most conservative Democrats in the House . His district has a Cook Political Report rating of R+16.

Taylor faced challenger Randall "Randy" McDonnell, a former IRS agent. McDonnell, the Republican Party nominee, had also unsuccessfully challenged Taylor in both 1998 and 2000.

Taylor first was elected in 1989 to Mississippi's 5th congressional district, after having lost to Larkin I. Smith in the 1988 race for that open seat, which had been vacated by Trent Lott when Lott made a successful run for the Senate. Smith died eight months later in a plane crash. Taylor came in first in the special election primary to fill the seat, winning the runoff election two weeks later and taking office on October 18, 1989.

In 1990, Taylor won a full term in the 5th District with 81% of the vote, and has been reelected at each election since.

His district was renumbered the 4th after the redistricting of 2000, which cost Mississippi a Congressional seat.
In 2004, Taylor was reelected to the House with 64% of their vote, choosing him over both Republican nominee Michael Lott and Reform nominee Tracella Hill.

2008

2010

2012

2014

2016

2018

2020

2022

Historical district boundaries

See also

Mississippi's congressional districts
List of United States congressional districts

References

 Congressional Biographical Directory of the United States 1774–present

04